The Fountain of Youth Stakes is an American Thoroughbred horse race run annually at Gulfstream Park in Hallandale Beach, Florida in late February. A Grade II event open to three-year-olds willing to race one and one-sixteenth miles on the dirt, it currently offers a purse of $300,000.  It is the final stakes prep to the Florida Derby and is an official prep race on the Road to the Kentucky Derby.

History
The race was named for the mythical Florida spring that granted eternal youth. It was sought by Spanish explorer Ponce de Leon who searched throughout the southeastern United States for it without success.

The race has long been a major prep for the Kentucky Derby, with multiple horses being victorious in both races. Four colts, Tim Tam (1958), Kauai King (1966), Spectacular Bid (1979) and Thunder Gulch (1995), won this race then went on to become "Dual Classic Winners," the first three winning the Kentucky Derby and the Preakness Stakes, while the last won the Derby and the Belmont Stakes. The 1985 winner, Proud Truth, won that year's Breeders' Cup Classic. More recently, the race has been used as a prep for Derby winner Orb in 2013 and Belmont Stakes winner Union Rags in 2012.

Records
Speed  record:
 1.41.00 @ 1-1/16 miles: Sensitive Prince (1978)
 1:48.87 @ 1-1/8 miles: Eskendereya (2010)

Most wins by an owner:
 3 - Calumet Farm (1957, 1958, 1961)
 3 - Michael Tabor  (1995, 2000, 2007)

Most wins by a jockey:
 5 - John Velazquez (2007, 2009, 2010, 2013, 2019)

Most wins by a trainer:
 4 - Todd A. Pletcher (2007, 2010, 2015, 2023)

Winners

 † 2015: Upstart finished first but was disqualified to second for impeding Itsaknockout in the stretch run.
 † 2006: Corinthian finished first but was disqualified to third for interference against both First Samurai and Flashy Bull.

External links
The Fountain of Youth Stakes at Pedigree Query

See also
Fountain of Youth Stakes top three finishers and starters
Road to the Kentucky Derby

References

1945 establishments in Florida
Horse races in Florida
Gulfstream Park
Flat horse races for three-year-olds
Triple Crown Prep Races
Graded stakes races in the United States
Recurring sporting events established in 1945
Grade 2 stakes races in the United States